Nine Mile Burn is a hamlet in Midlothian, Scotland, the last in Midlothian when heading south on the A702 road.

It is located at the foot of the Pentland Hills, near Penicuik and about 2 km north-east of the village of Carlops.

References

External links

FamilySearch - Penicuik Parish, Midlothian, Scotland

Villages in Midlothian